Paranomis is a genus of moths of the family Crambidae.

Species
Paranomis denticosta Munroe & Mutuura, 1968
Paranomis moupinensis Munroe & Mutuura, 1968
Paranomis nodicosta Munroe & Mutuura, 1968
Paranomis sidemialis Munroe & Mutuura, 1968

References

Natural History Museum Lepidoptera genus database

Pyraustinae
Crambidae genera
Taxa named by Eugene G. Munroe